Line 3 is a north–south line on the Nanjing Metro.

Opening timeline

Station list

Future Development
Phase 3 of Line 3 started construction in 2021. The extension is 3.3 km with 2 new stations.

References

External links 
Line 3 on the official Nanjing Metro website (includes route map) 

Nanjing Metro lines
2015 establishments in China
Railway lines opened in 2015